is a private junior college in Naka-ku, Okayama, Japan.

Academic departments
 Child education
 Nutrition

History 
 The predecessor of the college was established in 1886 as Sanyo Eiwa Women's School.
 Sanyo Gakuen College was founded in 1969, for women only.
 The college became coeducational in 2009.

See also
 Sanyo Gakuen University
 List of junior colleges in Japan

External links
 

Japanese junior colleges
Educational institutions established in 1969
Universities and colleges in Okayama Prefecture
Private universities and colleges in Japan
1969 establishments in Japan